George Russell (Ron) Hatton  (1932–2012)  was a suffragan bishop in the Nova Scotia and Prince Edward Island, Canada.

Hatton was educated at the University of King's College.  After a curacy at All Saints Cathedral, Halifax he was the chaplain at Dalhousie University. He was the incumbent at Lantz then  the director of the University Episcopal Centre, Minneapolis. He was the National Affairs Officer for the Anglican Church of Canada from 1972 to 1977 then President of the  Atlantic School of Theology, Halifax.

He died on 14 January 2012.

References

1932 births
20th-century Anglican Church of Canada bishops
University of King's College alumni
2012 deaths
Anglican bishops of Nova Scotia and Prince Edward Island